The First Day is a 1971 Austrian drama film directed by Herbert Holba. It was entered into the 21st Berlin International Film Festival.

Cast
 Ariane Niehoff - Das Mädchen
 Olga Felber - Die Erniedrigte
 Heinz Herki - Der Tor
 Karlheinz Hayek - Der Flüchtling
 Gerhard Stingl - Der Einzelgänger
 Wolfgang Karner - Der komische Reiter
 Peter Kadluz - Der weniger komische Reiter
 Wilhelm Pellert - Der Anführer
 Nora Aschacher - Das lustige Mädchen
 Ingeborg Staudt - Ihre Freundin
 Josef Frieser - Der Blinde
 Robert Trampitsch - Der zarte Knabe
 Jakob Holzer - Der plumpe Knabe
 Ferdinand Bischofter - Der gutmütige Knabe
 Elfriede Stromberger - Das Mädchen mit dem Amulett
 Heimo Wisser - Der Gezeichnete

References

External links

1971 films
1970s German-language films
1971 drama films
Austrian black-and-white films
Films directed by Herbert Holba
Austrian drama films